Uranyl fluoride is the inorganic compound with the formula UO2F2.  As shown by x-ray crystallography, the uranyl (UO22+) centers are complemented by six fluoride ligands.

This salt is very soluble in water as well as hygroscopic. It is forms in the hydrolysis of uranium hexafluoride (UF6):
 UF6 + 2 H2O → UO2F2 + 4 HF

References 

Uranyl compounds
Fluorides
Metal halides
Oxyfluorides